Trinley Gyatso (also spelled Trinle Gyatso and Thinle Gyatso; 26 January 1857 – 25 April 1875) was the 12th Dalai Lama of Tibet.

His short life coincided with a time of major political unrest and wars among Tibet's neighbours. Tibet particularly suffered from the weakening of the Qing Dynasty which had previously provided it with some support against the British Empire, which was aiming to influence Tibet as an expansion from its colonisation of India.

He was recognised as a reincarnation of the Dalai Lama in 1858 and enthroned in 1860. During his period of training as a child, Tibet banned Europeans from entering the country because of wars Britain was fighting against Sikkim and Bhutan, both of whom were controlled to a considerable degree by the lamas in Lhasa. These wars were seen as efforts to colonise Tibet—something seen as unacceptable by the lamas. Also, with missionaries threatening to enter Tibet via the Mekong and Salween Rivers, Tibetans tried to emphasize the Qing Dynasty's authority over Tibet in the 1860s.

Trinley Gyatso was fully enthroned as Dalai Lama on 11 March 1873 but could not stamp his full authority on Tibet because he died of a mysterious illness on 25 April 1875.

"During the period of the short-lived Dalai Lamas—from the Ninth to the Twelfth incarnations—the Panchen was the lama of the hour, filling the void left by the four Dalai Lamas who died in their youth."

References

Further reading
Mullin, Glenn H. (2001). The Fourteen Dalai Lamas: A Sacred Legacy of Reincarnation, pp. 367–375. Clear Light Publishers. Santa Fe, New Mexico. .

1857 births
1875 deaths
A2
Child monarchs from Asia
19th-century Tibetan people